Institute of Management Technology, Hyderabad (IMT Hyderabad or IMTH) is an autonomous higher education institute located in Hyderabad, Telangana, India.

History
The institute was established in 2011. In Hyderabad campus was inaugurated in 2011.

Academics
IMT Hyderabad offers 2-year full-time residential postgraduate diplomas in management (PGDM) and 15-month weekend only executive PGDM. It also offers doctoral level fellowship programmes.

Campus

See also

 List of business schools in Hyderabad, India

References

External links
 

Business schools in Hyderabad, India
All India Council for Technical Education
2011 establishments in Andhra Pradesh
Educational institutions established in 2011